Yelbeghen (Latin: Yelbegän, Cyrillic script: Йилбегән) is a multi-headed man-eating monster in the mythology of Turkic peoples of Siberia.

Turkish Dragon
In the original myths Yelbegen was a multi-headed dragon or serpent-like creature (the etymology of the name points to this--Yel = "wind, magic, demonic" and begen comes from böke - "giant serpent, dragon"), but over time it evolved into other forms such as a multi-headed ogre-like behemoth. Some epics feature multiple Yelbegen with different numbers of heads who are the offspring of Altan Sibaldai, "the golden witch", a cohort of the lord of the underworld. Some epics also mention a Yelbegen king named Yelmogus. Still other stories tell of multiple Yelbegens of various colors.

In a legend of the Altai, there   was   a  seven-headed   ogre, Yelbeghen, taking  revenge  from  the  Sun  and  the Moon, and  used   to  eat  them. The Ülgen  shot  arrows   to  Yelbeghen. This  ogre   sometimes   chewed  the   stars in his mouth  and broke them into pieces and  then   spit  them  out. Therefore, stars used   to   run away from   him into  the  sky... According  to  Altai people,  eclipse  of  the  Moon  used to  take  place  because  of  this  ogre. For this  reason, when  there is  moon  eclipse  they  say: ‘’Again  Yelbegen (seven-headed  ogre)  ate  the  Moon...’’

Yelbeghen, sometimes Yelmogus is generally considered to be a creature separate from dragons and a polar opposite to them in its nature. It is a being of pure evil, a dragon-like beast and dreadful monster with no reason, that usually lives in dark and hostile places, or guards unreachable locations in fairy-tales. It is often multi-headed (with 3, 7 or 9 heads) and breathes fire. It is considered as "extremely intelligent, wise and knowledgeable" creature of "superhuman / supernatural" strength and proficiency in magic, very rich (usually described as having castles of enormous riches hidden in distant lands) and often lustful for women, with whom it is capable of making offspring. It often breathes fire and is generally accepted as a highly respected being, and while not always being benevolent, never as an entirely evil creature. Legends were spread about many historical and mythical heroes that they were conceived by a dragon.

Yalpaghan Khan
Yalpaghan Khan (Turkish: Yalpağan) is the dragon king of Altai and Turkish mythologies. He is the king of all the dragons. He also seems like a dragon with seven heads at any time.

See also
Hydra
Zilant
Yuxa
Chuvash dragon
Slavic dragon

References

  Türk Mitolojisi Ansiklopedik Sözlük, Celal Beydili, Yurt Yayınevi

Turkic legendary creatures
Dragons
Mythical many-headed creatures